McGee Rock is an isolated rock at the south side of Parker Pass, about  south of Zuncich Hill, in Marie Byrd Land, Antarctica. It was mapped by the United States Geological Survey from surveys and U.S. Navy air photos, 1959–65, and was named by the Advisory Committee on Antarctic Names for Wayne R. McGee, U.S. Navy, an equipment operator at Byrd Station, 1966.

References

Rock formations of Marie Byrd Land